Aksungur is a village in the Osmangazi district of Bursa Province in Turkey.

References

Villages in Osmangazi District